San Miguel (Spanish  for "Saint Michael") is a commune of Chile located in Santiago Province, Santiago Metropolitan Region. It was founded on August 10, 1896.

Administration
As a commune, San Miguel is a third-level administrative division of Chile administered by a municipal council, headed by an alcalde who is directly elected every four years. The alcalde's office (alcaldía) is located at Gran Avenida No. 3418. The 2012-2016 alcalde is Julio Palestro Velásquez (PS). The communal council has the following members:
 Francia Palestro Contreras (PS)
 Luis Sanhueza Bravo (RN)
 Erika Martinez Osorio (PC)
 Carolina Onofri Salinas (RN) 
 David Navarro Carachi (PRSD)
 Felipe Von Unger Valdés (UDI)
 Rodrigo Iturra Becerra (PDC)
 Ernesto Balcázar Gamboa (PS)

San Miguel belongs to the 28th electoral division (together with Pedro Aguirre Cerda and Lo Espejo) and the  8th senatorial constituency (Santiago East). It is represented in the Chamber of Deputies of the National Congress by the deputies Guillermo Teillier del Valle (PCCh) and Pedro Browne Urrejola (RN). It is represented in the Senate by senators Soledad Alvear (PDC) and Pablo Longueira (UDI).

Demographics
The population fell by 4.8% (3997 persons) between the 1992 and 2002 censuses. The demonym for a person from San Miguel is sanmiguelino for a man or sanmiguelina for a woman.

Other statistics
Average annual household income: US$39,670 (PPP, 2006)
Population below poverty line: 2.5% (2006)
Regional quality of life index: 82.17, high, 6 out of 52 (2005)
Human Development Index: 0.765, 31 out of 341 (2003)

Notable sanmiguelinos
Los Prisioneros
Gepe
Paulina Urrutia
Ruben Palma
Themo Lobos
Francisco Dominguez
Daniela Vega

References

External links
  Municipality of San Miguel

Populated places in Santiago Province, Chile
Geography of Santiago, Chile
Communes of Chile
Populated places established in 1896
1896 establishments in Chile